Karen Elise Baldwin (born 16 June 1964) is a Canadian film producer. She is married to producer Howard Baldwin, and they have co-founded their own production firm. She won a Golden Globe for her 2004 film Ray.

Filmography
 Sudden Death, (1995 associate)
 The Patriot, (1998, associate)
 Gideon, (1998)
 The Long Kill, (1999, executive)
 Resurrection, (1999, co-producer)
 Mystery, Alaska, (1999, co-producer)
 Joshua, (2002)
 Children on Their Birthdays, (2002)
 Swimming Upstream, (2003)
 Where the Red Fern Grows, (2003, executive)
 Danny Deckchair, (2003, executive)
 Ray, (2004)
 Sahara, (2005)
 The Game of Their Lives, (2005)
 A Sound of Thunder, (2005)
 Death Sentence, (2007)
 The Other Side of the Tracks, (2008)
 Atlas Shrugged: Part I, (2011, executive)
 Mr. Hockey: The Gordie Howe Story, (2013, executive)
 Before We Go, (2014)
 The Hurricane Heist, (2018)
 Odd Man Rush, (2020)

References

Film producers from Ontario
1964 births
Living people
Canadian women film producers
Canadian film production company founders